Aleandro Baldi (born 11 April 1959) is an Italian singer-songwriter and composer.

Life and career 
Born in Greve in Chianti, Florence as Aleandro Civai, blind, Baldi began playing the guitar as an autodidact while he was at the Reggio Emilia College for the Blind.  He debuted in 1986, entering the Sanremo Music Festival with "La nave va", a song he composed and arranged, ranking second in the "Newcomers" section. He later won the Newcomers section of the Festival in 1992, in a duet with Francesca Alotta, with the song "Non amarmi", which later became an international hit with the title "No Me Ames". In 1994 Baldi won again the Sanremo Festival, this time in its "Big Artists" section, with the song "Passerà"; the song was covered by the group Il Divo in their debut album. In 1994, Baldi also released an autobiographical book, Il sole dentro, written in collaboration with Marcello Lazzerini.

Outside of his musical career, Baldi is also a massophysiotherapist.

Discography

Album 
 1987 - Aleandro Baldi
 1989 - E sia così
 1992 - Il sole 
 1994 - Ti chiedo onestà
 1996 - Tu sei me
 2002 - Il meglio e il nuovo
 2007 - Liberamente tratto
 2010 - Italian Love Songs

References

External links 

 Aleandro Baldi at Discogs

1959 births
Living people
People from Greve in Chianti
Italian male singers
Italian singer-songwriters
Italian pop singers
Italian composers
Italian male composers
Sanremo Music Festival winners
Sanremo Music Festival winners of the newcomers section
Blind musicians
Italian blind people